Techniques is a compilation album by rock band Modern Baseball. It contains 16 tracks which are songs compiled from previous EPs Couples Therapy, The Nameless Ranger and demos from albums Sports and You're Gonna Miss It All. There is also an original song titled "Secret Bonus Track".

Track listing 
 "Best Friend"
 "Short"
 "My Love"
 "Casket"
 "Home"
 "Hope"
 "It's Cold Out Here"
 "The Weekend" (Demo)
 "Tears Over Beers" (Demo)
 "Phone Tag"
 "(240)"
 "Re-Do" (Acoustic)
 "Voting Early"
 "Rock Bottom" (Demo)
 "Pothole" (Demo)
 "Secret" (Bonus track)

References 

Modern Baseball albums
2014 compilation albums
Pop punk compilation albums
Lame-O Records albums